Joshua Hathaway (born 19 October, 2003) is a British rugby union player for Gloucester. He has represented Wales and England at under-20 level. He can play at fly-half, on the wing and at full-back.

Career
Born in Aberyswyth, he attended Ysgol Penglais School. He played for Aberystwyth RFC and represented Ceredigion Schools at age group level. Hathaway was on the books at Scarlets Academy and was capped by the Wales national under 20 rugby union team in March 2022. After moving to Hartbury College he signed a three year contract with Gloucester RFC in November 2022, and switched to represent England. He made his debut for Gloucester in the Premiership Rugby Cup in November 2022.

He made his first start for England under 20s against Scotland under 20s in the 2023 Six Nations Under 20s Championship, in February 2023. Playing for England, he scored a hat-trick of tries in 15 minutes on debut against Scotland. He was identified by BBC Sport as one of the stars of the under-20 Six Nations tournament held in 2023.

References

 2003 births
Living people
Gloucester Rugby players
Rugby union fly-halves
English rugby union players 
Rugby union fullbacks
Welsh rugby union players 
Rugby union wings
Rugby union players from Aberystwyth